Fantasy is the second studio album by Chinese Taiwan singer Jay Chou, released on 14 September 2001 by BMG Taiwan.

The album was nominated for ten Golden Melody Awards and won five awards, including Best Pop Vocal Album, Best Album Producer, and Best Composer. The album also won for an IFPI Hong Kong Top Sales Music Award for Top 10 Best Selling Mandarin Albums of the Year.

The tracks, "Simple Love" and "I Find It Hard to Say", are listed at number 2 and number 17 respectively on the 2001's Hit FM Top 100 Singles of the Year chart.

Track listing

Awards

References

External links
  Jay Chou discography@JVR Music

2001 albums
Bertelsmann Music Group albums
Jay Chou albums